Sergey Vasilyevich Ivanov (1864–1910) was a Russian genre and history painter, known for his Social Realism.

Biography 

His father was a tax collector for the Customs Service.

The Institute was not to his liking and he was an indifferent student, so a family friend who was an amateur artist encouraged his father to send him to the Moscow School of Painting, Sculpture and Architecture (MSPSA). With a recommendation from Vasily Perov, he began auditing classes there in 1878; studying with Illarion Pryanishnikov and Evgraf Sorokin.

He left there in 1882 to attend the Imperial Academy of Arts. Dissatisfaction with the school's administration and financial difficulties forced him to return to Moscow in 1884. He went back to the MSPSA and graduated in 1885.

At that time he started work on a series of paintings devoted to "", the process of resettling peasants to outlying, vacant areas (mostly in Siberia) in an attempt to ease overcrowding in the villages after the Emancipation reform of 1861. The move was often very arduous and many died on the way. From 1885 to 1889, he toured the provinces of Samara, Saratov, Astrakhan and Orenburg, documenting the migrants' lives. This was followed by a series on convicts. In the mid 1890s, he began to focus on historical works.

In 1899, he became a member of the Peredvizhniki, but was soon dissatisfied with their emphasis on "lovely scenes". In 1903, he was one of the founders of the "" (Union of Russian Artists), temporarily replacing the better-known "Mir Iskusstva". In 1905, the Imperial Academy named him an "Academician". Later that year, during the Moscow Uprising, he made numerous sketches while also helping the wounded.

From 1903 to 1910, he taught at the MSPSA. He was also known as an illustrator; creating drawings for classics by Gogol, Lermontov and Pushkin, among others. He died of a heart attack at his dacha near the Yakhroma River.

Selected paintings

References

Further reading 
 Ilya Granovsky, Сергей Васильевич Иванов, Советский Художник, 1964

External links 

Sergey Ivanov @ Russian Paintings

1864 births
1910 deaths
People from Moscow Oblast
People from Ruzsky Uyezd
Peredvizhniki
Russian male painters
Russian genre painters
Social realist artists
19th-century painters from the Russian Empire
19th-century male artists from the Russian Empire
19th-century painters of historical subjects
20th-century Russian male artists
20th-century Russian painters
Moscow School of Painting, Sculpture and Architecture alumni
Imperial Academy of Arts alumni